The Louts is a left tributary of the Adour, in Nouvelle-Aquitaine, in the Southwest of France.

Name 
It is documented in medieval Latin as Fluvius qui dicitur Lossium.

Geography 
The Louts rises in Thèze, flows northwest through Chalosse and joins the Adour, in Hinx.

Départements and towns 
 Pyrénées-Atlantiques : Thèze, Arzacq-Arraziguet, Lème, Méracq, Vignes.
 Landes : Hagetmau, Saint-Cricq-Chalosse, Caupenne.

References

Rivers of France
Rivers of Pyrénées-Atlantiques
Rivers of Landes (department)
Rivers of Nouvelle-Aquitaine